Norfolk was a federal electoral district represented in the House of Commons of Canada from 1904 to 1925. It was located in the province of Ontario. This riding was first created in 1903 from Norfolk North and Norfolk South ridings.

It consisted of the county of Norfolk.

The electoral district was abolished in 1924 when it was merged into Norfolk—Elgin riding. 

It was recreated in 1933, again consisting of the county of Norfolk.

The electoral district was abolished in 1966 when it was merged into Norfolk—Haldimand riding.

Members of Parliament

This riding elected the following members of the House of Commons of Canada:

Election results

1904–1925

|}

|}

|}

|}

|}

1935–1968

|}

|}

|}

|}

|}

|}

|}

|}

|}

|}

See also 

 List of Canadian federal electoral districts
 Historical federal electoral districts of Canada

External links 

 Website of the Parliament of Canada

Former federal electoral districts of Ontario
Norfolk County, Ontario